The 1988 Orlando Lions season was the second season of the team in the new American Soccer League.  This year, the team finished in fourth place in the Southern Division of the league.  They did not make the playoffs.

Background

Review

Competitions

ASL regular season

League standings

Results summaries

Results by round

Match reports

ASL Playoffs

Bracket

Match reports

Statistics

Transfers

References 

1989
Orlando Lions
Orlando